Émile Moussat (26 June 1885 – 5 August 1965) was a French writer. His work was part of the literature event in the art competition at the 1928 Summer Olympics.

References

1885 births
1965 deaths
20th-century French male writers
Olympic competitors in art competitions
People from Algiers